Safdar Tawakoli; (born 1942 in Yakawlang, Bamyan) is an ethnic Hazara musician from Afghanistan. He focuses and plays mostly Hazara folkloric and regional traditional music based on the dambura.

Early life
Safdar Tawakoli was born in 1942, in Yakawlang, Bamyan, Afghanistan to a family of moderate means. His interest in music was nurtured during his youth, but he had to overcome the conservative tradition and religious restrictions of his local culture. Despite these, he pursued his field of interest and became a devoted artist. He always admired and in some cases envied the popularity of national singers. He mastered the "dambura", a regional long necked stringed instrument popular among the Hazaras of central Afghanistan.

Career
In pursuit of a career in music, he left Bamyan to run a music store in Kabul that sold cassettes. It was his hard work and talent that led him to the studios of Radio Kabul and Afghanistan's National Television, where he did many shows and sung hundreds of songs. Safdar Tawakuli became a household name in regions and the number of his listeners increased. He became an iconic singer and was awarded with several awards and honorary medals.  He has represented Afghan Music in numerous international shows.

He headed the Musical group of the Ministry of Cultural Affairs of Afghanistan from 1986 to 1995 for eleven consecutive years.

Like everything else Safdar Tawakoli's artistry fell victim to the civil war during which he lost his career, his home, his beloved son but he never lost his fame. He stayed in Afghanistan in extreme conditions, even during the time of the Taliban when his life was in grieve danger.

After the fall of Taliban, his musical number, "Agar az Bamiyan o Qandahari - Hamay mo Pag biraari"; became a symbol of national unity and pride for Afghanistan when it was re-sung by the prominent Afghan Singer Farhad Darya. He was one of the first singers to sing on Afghanistan's National Radio immediately after the fall of the Taliban.

References

External links
Safdar's fansite

1942 births
Living people
Hazara singers
Dombra players
Afghan male singers
Persian-language singers
People from Bamyan Province
20th-century Afghan male singers